Bruce McLean  (born 1944) is a Scottish sculptor, performance artist and painter.

McLean was born in Glasgow and studied at Glasgow School of Art from 1961 to 1963, and at Saint Martin's School of Art, London, from 1963 to 1966. At Saint Martin's, McLean studied with Anthony Caro and Phillip King.
In reaction to what he regarded as the academicism of his teachers he began making sculpture from rubbish.

McLean has produced paintings, sculptures, ceramics, prints, work with film, theatre and books. McLean was Head of Graduate Painting at The Slade School of Fine Art London 
He has had one man exhibitions including Tate Gallery in London, Arnolfini, Bristol, The New Art Gallery, Walsall, The Modern Art Gallery in Vienna and Museum of Modern Art, Oxford.

In 1985, he won the John Moores Painting Prize.

Mclean lives and works in London. His son is the architect Will McLean.

External links 

 Bruce McLean's on the Tate

References

1944 births
Living people
20th-century British sculptors
20th-century Scottish painters
21st-century Scottish painters
21st-century Scottish male artists
Academics of the Slade School of Fine Art
Alumni of the Glasgow School of Art
Alumni of Saint Martin's School of Art
Artists from Glasgow
British conceptual artists
Scottish contemporary artists
Scottish male painters
Scottish male sculptors
Scottish performance artists
Scottish sculptors
20th-century Scottish male artists